Bertrand du Castel is a French-American author and scientist who won in 2005 the Visionary Award
 from Card Technology Magazine for pioneering the Java Card, which by 2007 had sold more than 3.5 billion
units worldwide. In 2008, du Castel and Timothy M. Jurgensen published Computer Theology: Intelligent Design of the World Wide Web, a theology of the World Wide Web based on a comparative study of human societies and computer networks.

Biography
Du Castel was born in 1952 in France a descendant of Louis-Eugène Cavaignac, who governed France as Prime Minister before being defeated by Napoléon III, and Paul Dubois, whose Joan of Arc sculpture stands in Washington D.C. A graduate of Ecole Polytechnique with a 1977 PhD from the University of Paris in Theoretical Computer Science, he was a Post-Doctoral Fellow at the IBM France Research Center before hiring with Schlumberger in France in 1978. He emigrated to the United States in 1983 where he has lived in Austin, Texas since, becoming an American citizen in 1994.

In 2000, du Castel was invited by the Association for the Advancement of Artificial Intelligence to
make a presentation of artificial intelligence advances in the industry that were original to academia. Consequently, du Castel was invited to present at the University of Maryland, Baltimore County (2001),
Massachusetts Institute of Technology (2001),
University of Texas at Austin (2002),
Peking University (2002),
Tsinghua University (2002),
Purdue University (2002),
Grenoble Institute of Technology (2003),
University of Paris (2004)
and University of Hamburg (2004),
which increasingly constituted the matter of a book on the relationship between religion and digital networks.

In 2005 du Castel joined with Timothy M. Jurgensen, author of two books on computer security, to write Computer Theology: Intelligent Design of the World Wide Web, which uses theological principles to study the role of religion in computer networks, and reciprocally studies religion in the light of well-established computer concepts such as trust. The book eventually proposed in 2008 a reference for the field of Computer Theology, following the road traced earlier by Donald Knuth
and Anne Foerst,
aiming at a better understanding of computer evolution as well as religion.

Positions
Schlumberger Fellow (2002–)
Head of Research Axalto (2003–2006)
Chairman of the Java Card Forum Technical Committee (1997–2006)
Director and vice-chairman of the Petrotechnical Open Standards Consortium (1996–2002)
Chairman and President of the WLAN Smart Card consortium (2004–2006)

Publications
Book

Main publications in neuroscience, computer security, logic, artificial intelligence, software engineering, and linguistics:

4

Patents

Awards
 Visionary Award (2005): Card Technology Magazine

References

French computer scientists
Living people
1952 births
American technology writers
French technology writers
Schlumberger people
École Polytechnique alumni
20th-century French scientists
21st-century French scientists